Midnight Lounge is the eighth studio album by American singer Jody Watley. Originally released only in Japan on her Avitone label (in conjunction with Universal Music Group), critical acclaim prompted Watley to release the album Stateside by way of a distribution deal with Avitone and Shanachie. The U.S. release also included productions from King Britt and Eastwest Connection.

Track listings
All songs written by Rodney Lee and Jody Watley, except where noted.

Personnel

Jody Watley – vocals, backing vocals
Roy Ayers – vibraphone
Michael Ciro – guitar
Dave Karasony – drums
Rodney Lee – multiple instruments
Mornington Lockett – saxophone
Barney McAll – keyboard 

Josh Milan – keyboard, hammond organ
John Scarpulla – saxophone
Martin Shaw – trumpet
Chris Standring – guitar
Dave Warrin – musician
John Warrin – guitar
John Wheeler – trombone

Production

Producers – Kenny "Dope" Gonzalez, King Britt, Rodney Lee, Ron Trent, Little Louie Vega, Dave Warrin, Jody Watley
Executive producers – Bill Coleman, Kenny "Dope" Gonzalez, Little Louie Vega
Engineer – Dave Darlington
Mixing – Steven Barkan, Jay-J, Ron Trent
Remixing – Dave Warrin
Mastering – Steve Hall
Editing – Albert Cabrera
Programming – Rodney Lee
Vocal arrangement – Jody Watley
Drum programming – Ron Trent
Instrumentation – Rodney Lee
Arrangers – Ron Trent, Dave Warrin
Art direction – Allen Hori, Jody Watley
Photography – Michael Walls

Charts

Weekly charts

Singles

References

External links

Jody Watley albums
2001 albums
2003 albums
Concept albums
Downtempo albums